CCNE may refer to:

Cisco Career Certifications
Commission on Collegiate Nursing Education
Cyclin E